Angkhana Phanprateep (born on 21 October 1973) is a Thai voice actress, ADR director, singer and former child actress.

Career 
She started her career in 1980s as a child actress, as which she appeared in the children's television show Sa Mo Sorn Pueng Noi (สโมสรผึ้งน้อย). She first started voice acting in 1990 by voicing Ped Noi (เป็ดน้อย, Little Duck Girl) from the Thai children's show Chao Khun Thong, which aired on Channel 7 in the 1990s. She began full-time freelance voice acting work in 1999.
Angkhana's major voice roles include Giselle in Enchanted, Mikaela Banes in Transformers: Revenge of the Fallen and Laa-Laa in Teletubbies. She has also worked as an ADR director in Maleficent: Mistress of Evil.

Voice roles

Anime 
Air Gear - Simca
Ballad of a Shinigami - Momo
Black Butler - Ciel Phantomhive
Bleach - Lirin, Yuzu Kurosaki, Retsu Unohana, Kūkaku Shiba
Buso Renkin - Tokiko Tsumura
Canaan - Alphard Alshua, Liang Qi
Capeta - Monami
D.Gray-man - Lenalee Lee
Dinosaur King - Rex Owen
Galaxy Angel II - Anise Azeat, Natsume Izayoi
Genesis of Aquarion - Reika
Gintama: The Movie - Kagura
Hayate the Combat Butler - Hinagiku Katsura, Isumi Saginomiya, Ayumu Nishizawa
Honey and Clover - Ayumi Yamada
Idaten Jump - Makoto Shido
Kamichama Karin - Kazune Kujyou
Kekkaishi - Princess, Shigemori Sumimura
Kotetsushin Jeeg - Tsubaki Tamashiro
MÄR - Dorothy
Mirmo! - Murumo, Azumi Hidaka
Sgt. Frog - Momoka Nishizawa
Shugo Chara! - Amu Hinamori
Soul Eater - Maka Albarn
Reborn! - I-Pin, Bianchi
S · A: Special A - Hikari Hanazono
Samurai 7 - Komachi, Yukino
Shakugan no Shana Second - Shana
Yu-Gi-Oh! GX - Rei Saotome

Non-anime 
Chao Khun Thong - Ped Noi
Teletubbies - Laa-Laa
Ben 10: Alien Force - Ben
Ben 10: Ultimate Alien - Ben
George of the Jungle (2007) - Ursula Scott
Stitch! - Yuna
Phineas and Ferb - Candace Flynn

Film dubbing 
Barbie: A Fashion Fairy Tale - Barbie
Barbie: A Fairy Secret - Barbie
Barbie in A Mermaid Tale - Merliah Summers
Barbie: Princess Charm School - Blair Willows
Casper's Scare School - Casper
Astro Boy - Toby Tenma/Astro
2012 - Kate Curtis (Amanda Peet)
Aliens in the Attic - Art Pearson (Henri Young), Bethany Pearson (Ashley Tisdale)
Avatar -  Trudy Chacón (Michelle Rodriguez)
Battle: Los Angeles - Elena Santos (Michelle Rodriguez)
Enchanted - Giselle (Amy Adams)
G.I. Joe: The Rise of Cobra - Ana Lewis/Anastascia DeCobray (Sienna Miller)
Inception - Ariadne (Elliot Page)
Jennifer's Body - Jennifer Check  (Megan Fox)
Marley & Me - Jenny Grogan (Jennifer Aniston)
Ninja Assassin - Kiriko (Kylie Goldstein)
Saw VI - Simone (Tanedra Howard)
The Sorcerer's Apprentice  - Veronica (Monica Bellucci)
Thor - Jane Foster (Natalie Portman)
Tooth Fairy - Carly (Ashley Judd), Randy (Chase Ellison)
Transformers: Revenge of the Fallen - Mikaela Banes (Megan Fox)
Watchmen - Silk Spectre II (Malin Åkerman)

References

Angkhana Phanprateep
Living people
1973 births
Angkhana Phanprateep